Leigh railway station is on the Redhill to Tonbridge Line and serves Leigh in Kent, England. It is  measured from   via . Train services are operated by Southern.

History
The station was opened as "Leigh Halt" in 1911; was renamed "Lyghe Halt" in 1917; "Leigh Halt" again about 1960; and "Leigh" in 1969. (Leigh is pronounced  (lie)—identical with the name of Lye railway station in the West Midlands.). The station was  destaffed in 1967.

In 1993 the line was electrified and services started to run through to London rather than being an extension of the Reading to Tonbridge North Downs Line service.

In 2007, a PERTIS machine was installed at the street entrance to the Tonbridge-bound platform (since replaced by a modern ticket machine). The station was until December 2008 operated by Southeastern before it transferred to Southern, whose green signage was installed before October 2008.

Facilities and Connections
Leigh station is unstaffed and facilities are limited. Tickets can be purchased from the self-service ticket machine at the station and there are passenger help points located on each platforms. There is also a basic shelter located on each platform. The station has step free access available to both platforms.

The station is served Monday-Saturday by the Autocar route 210 which provides connections to Tonbridge and Chiddingstone Causeway.

Services 
All services at Leigh are operated by Southern using Class 377 EMUs. 

The typical off-peak service in trains per hour is:
 1 tph to 
 1 tph to 

Services increase to 2 tph in each direction during the peak hours.

References

External links

Buildings and structures in Sevenoaks District
Railway stations in Kent
DfT Category F1 stations
Former South Eastern Railway (UK) stations
Railway stations in Great Britain opened in 1911
Railway stations served by Govia Thameslink Railway
1911 establishments in England